Black Notley is a village and civil parish in Essex, England. According to the 2011 census including Young's End it had a population of 2,478.

History
The place-name 'Notley' is first attested in a Saxon charter of 998 as Hnutlea, and appears as 'Nutlea' in the Domesday Book of 1086. The name means 'nut wood'. 'Black Notley' is first attested in 1240.

The parish church is dedicated to both St. Peter and St. Paul, and has walls of flint and pebble. The nave was constructed in the 12th century and the chancel was rebuilt around the 16th century when also the south porch and bell-turret were added. Around 100 yards to the south of the church is the 15th century Grade II listed Black Notley Hall.

Geography
The village is in the district of Braintree, but as of 2010, forms part of the parliamentary constituency of Witham. It has its own parish council, and is part of the wider Cressing, Black Notley, White Notley and Faulkbourne parish cluster.

The Cressing railway station, on the Braintree Branch Line, is around half a mile from the village centre. It is close to the River Brain.  In 2002 work was completed on the new estate, built in place of the old hospital giving 350 new houses to the area.

Notable residents
Arthur Halestrap - one of the last surviving soldiers of World War I.
William Bedell - Anglican churchman.
John Ray - Naturalist, known as the father of English natural history.

References

External links

Black Notley Parish Council website
Black Notley - Visit Essex

Villages in Essex
Braintree District